Andek is a town and commune in Cameroon. Andek is the headquarters of Ngie local government area in Momo County,  Northern Zone of Ambazonia

See also
Communes of Cameroon
Tinechung

References
 Site de la primature - Élections municipales 2002 
 Contrôle de gestion et performance des services publics communaux des villes camerounaises - Thèse de Donation Avele, Université Montesquieu Bordeaux IV 
 Charles Nanga, La réforme de l’administration territoriale au Cameroun à la lumière de la loi constitutionnelle n° 96/06 du 18 janvier 1996, Mémoire ENA. 

Communes of Northwest Region (Cameroon)